Juan Antonio Torres Servín (born 15 July 1968) is a Mexican football manager and former player.

References

External links 
Juan Antonio Torres at Official Liga MX Profile
Juan Antonio Torres at Medio Tiempo
Juan Antonio Torres at UNAM Coach
Juan Antonio Torres at Los Pumas UNAM

1968 births
Living people
Racing drivers from Mexico City
Mexican football managers
Mexican footballers
Association football midfielders
Antigua GFC managers